Vegepet is a line of dietary supplement products for dogs and cats being fed a vegan diet, sold by Compassion Circle.

Nutritional study

In 2004, a study published in the Journal of the American Veterinary Medical Association evaluated two commercial vegetarian pet foods for nutritional adequacy, which included Vegecat KibbleMix supplement.  The study concluded that both Vegecat KibbleMix and the other vegetarian pet food had multiple nutritional inadequacies, particularly taurine, when compared against the AAFCO minimal nutrient profile for cat diets. Vitamin A level leaned high but was still within the AAFCO maximum safe
intake. In an apologetic reply, the manufacturer of Vegecat attributed the test results to a manufacturing error during the mixing process and an inaccurate nutrient profile of a food yeast, and asserted they were taking steps to correct the problems.

See also
 Vegetarian and vegan dog diet
 Dog food § Vegetarian and vegan dog diet
 Cat food § Vegetarian and vegan diet

References

External links
 

Cat food brands
Dog food brands
Vegan pet food brands